Cartoon Network is a Canadian English language discretionary specialty channel owned by Corus Entertainment. It is a licensed version of the U.S. channel of the same name, and primarily carries the majority of current-day programming aired by Cartoon Network in the United States.

The network operates with separate Eastern and Pacific feeds.  It originally operated under a newly-issued category B license; in September 2015, in an effort to widen Cartoon Network's availability, its sister network Teletoon Retro was discontinued, and Cartoon Network was moved to its license and channel allotments. This expanded its carriage to five million households nationwide. In February 2023, Corus announced that the Cartoon Network branding would be moved to Teletoon on March 27, 2023, with the existing Cartoon Network channel relaunching as Boomerang the same day.

History

As Cartoon Network 
In November 2011, the CRTC granted a category B license to Teletoon Canada, Inc. for a new specialty channel tentatively named "Teletoon Kapow!", which would be "devoted to programming from international markets, featuring the latest trends in non-violent action, adventure, superheroes, comedy and interactivity". 

In February 2012, Teletoon announced that it would launch a Canadian version of Cartoon Network. The channel would also feature a version of its late-night block Adult Swim. Ahead of the launch, Cartoon Network-branded blocks were added to Teletoon and Teletoon Retro as a preview for the new channel. Cartoon Network launched on July 4, 2012, using the Teletoon Kapow! license.

On March 4, 2013, Corus Entertainment announced that it would acquire Astral Media's 50% ownership interest in Teletoon Canada, as part of Astral's pending acquisition by Bell Media (which had earlier been rejected by the CRTC in October 2012, but was restructured to allow the sale of certain Astral Media properties in order to allow the purchase to clear regulatory hurdles).

Corus's purchase was cleared by the Competition Bureau two weeks later on March 18. On December 20, 2013, the CRTC approved Corus's full ownership of Teletoon Canada and it was purchased by Corus on January 1, 2014. The channel continues to be owned by Teletoon Canada, now wholly owned by Corus Entertainment under its Corus Kids division.

In August 2015, internal sources at Corus reported that Cartoon Network would be moved to the channel allotments of Teletoon Retro, which was being shut down on September 1, 2015. It was stated that this change would enable the channel to have wider distribution, as Teletoon Retro was carried by more providers than Cartoon Network, specifically Shaw Cable, Shaw Direct and Rogers Cable. At that time, Cartoon Network moved under the auspices of the license that was formerly used by Teletoon Retro; the original Teletoon Kapow! license was returned to the CRTC on October 2, 2015.

On March 4, 2019, the primetime Adult Swim block was discontinued on the channel, due to the planned re-launch of Action as an Adult Swim-branded channel on April 1.

As Boomerang 
On February 21, 2023, Corus announced that Teletoon would rebrand as Cartoon Network on March 27, 2023. The existing Cartoon Network channel will concurrently relaunch as a Canadian version of its sister brand Boomerang, which will focus on established franchises from the Cartoon Network and Warner Bros. Animation libraries (with Teletoon franchises such as Total Drama also acknowledged as being part of its launch programming).

Programming

Cartoon Network's programming has largely been drawn from the library of its U.S. counterpart, along with library programs from sister network Teletoon to comply with Canadian content rules. Generally, first-run airings of Cartoon Network's higher-profile programming have remained on Teletoon, with second runs airing on Cartoon Network.

From its launch through April 2019, Cartoon Network also carried a localized version of the U.S. channel's primetime and late-night block Adult Swim, which carried animated and live-action comedy programs targeting a teen and young adult audience; the block and its Teletoon counterpart Teletoon at Night were spun off into a dedicated Adult Swim channel in 2019.

References

External links

Cartoon Network
Corus Entertainment networks
English-language television stations in Canada
Children's television networks in Canada
2012 establishments in Canada
Television channels and stations established in 2012
Digital cable television networks in Canada